Class 62 may refer to:
Belgian Railways Class 62 - a class of diesel locomotives
DRG Class 62 - a class of German 4-6-4T locomotives
JNR Class C62 - a class of Japanese 4-6-4 locomotives
JNR Class D62 - a class of Japanese 2-8-4 locomotives
JŽ class 62 - a class of Yugoslavian 0-6-0T locomotives, ex-USATC S100 with extra Yugoslav-built examples.
NSB Class 62 - a class of Norwegian electric railcars